Pamela Hughes Patenaude (born January 20, 1961) is a former United States Deputy Secretary of Housing and Urban Development, having served from September 2017 to January 2019, under President Donald Trump.

Early life and education 
Patenaude was raised in New Hampshire and attended Saint Anselm College, graduating in 1983. She later received a master's degree (M.A.) in community economic development from Southern New Hampshire University.

Career 
Prior to her position at HUD, she served as president of the J. Ronald Terwilliger Foundation for Housing America's Families and as director of housing policy at the Bipartisan Policy Center. She served as Housing and Urban Development Assistant Secretary for Community, Planning and Development during the George W. Bush Administration.

Trump Administration 
She was proposed as a candidate for Secretary of Housing and Urban Development in the Trump administration, but was ultimately nominated for the role of Deputy Secretary under eventual Secretary Ben Carson. 

Patenaude's nomination was praised by the Senate delegation of her home state of New Hampshire, both of whom are Democrats. Senator Maggie Hassan stated that "I am confident that she will continue to be an advocate for affordable housing opportunities in New Hampshire and across America." This nomination was confirmed by an 80–17 vote of the U.S. Senate on September 14, 2017. 

She resigned at the end of 2018 after a series of disagreements with Carson and the Trump White House, including addressing racial segregation and the Trump Administration's effort to withhold congressionally appropriated money to Puerto Rico for Hurricane Maria relief.

Photos

References

External links

}

1961 births
Living people
Politicians from Pittsburgh
Saint Anselm College alumni
Southern New Hampshire University alumni
George W. Bush administration personnel
Trump administration personnel
United States Deputy Secretaries of Housing and Urban Development